Events from the year 1601 in Denmark.

Incumbents 

 Monarch — Christian IV
 Steward of the Realm — Christoffer Valkendorff (until 17 January)

Events

Births 
 13 September – Axel Urup, military officer and supreme court justice (died 1671)

Deaths 
 17 January – Christoffer Valkendorff, Danish-Norwegian statesman and Steward of the Realm (born 1525)
 24 October – Tycho Brahe, astronomer and alchemist (born 1546)

References 

 
Denmark
Years of the 17th century in Denmark